Cheikh Tidiane Sane (born May 4, 1992) is a Senegalese professional basketball player for AMSB of the LNB Pro B. He formerly played professionally in Denmark, Greece, Japan and Switzerland.

References

External links
 Eurobasket.com profile
 RealGM profile

1992 births
Living people
Koroivos B.C. players
Marshall Thundering Herd men's basketball players
Saitama Broncos players
Senegalese expatriate basketball people in Denmark
Senegalese expatriate basketball people in Greece
Senegalese expatriate basketball people in Japan
Senegalese expatriate basketball people in Switzerland
Senegalese expatriate basketball people in the United States
Senegalese men's basketball players
Power forwards (basketball)
Starwings Basel players